National Highway 907 (NH 907) is an Indian National Highway starts from Paonta Sahib, Himachal Pradesh and ends at Yamuna Nagar, Haryana. Before renumbering of national highways of India, route of NH-907 was part of old national highway 73A.

Route 
NH907 links Paonta Sahib, Darpur, Ledi, Chhachhrauli, Jagadhri Chowk and Yamuna Nagar in the states of Haryana and Himachal Pradesh.

Junctions  
 
  Terminal near Paonta Sahib.
  Terminal near Yamuna Nagar.

See also 
 List of National Highways in India
 List of National Highways in India by state
 National Highways Development Project

References

External links
NH 907 on OpenStreetMap

National highways in India
National Highways in Haryana
National Highways in Himachal Pradesh